The Eunuch (Chinese:鬼太監) is a 1971 Hong Kong wuxia film directed by Teddy Yip, and starring Pai Ying and Lisa Chiao Chiao.

Cast
Pai Ying as Lord Kuei Teh Hai
Lisa Chiao Chiao as Yen Yen
Chung Wa as Prince Chu Chin
Yeung Chi-hing as Green Bamboo Master
Mang Ga as Bamboo Master's daughter
Wang Hsieh as Szu Sung
Lo Wei as King
Ouyang Sha-fei as Kun Erh King's wife
Hao Li-jen as Man Liang Po
James Tien as Kuei's low rank officer
Yeung Chak-lam as fighter beaten in contest
Little Unicorn as soldier who kills child
Chu Gam as Lord Wang
Wong Chung-shun as Lord Lui
Chow Siu-loi as Swordsman Wu Chun
Lei Lung as soldier searching for waiter
Billy Chan as assassin
Chui Chung-hok as assassin
Yung Yuk-yi as Yen Yen's Female master
Sammo Hung as first fighter in final contest
Mars as soldier
Ling Hon as spectator
Yee Kwan as spectator
Chin Chun as spectator
Tsang Choh-lam as waiter who robes baby
Simon Chui as Kuan Wu (waiter / assassin)
Ho Wan-tai as Kuei's man
Yeung Wah as spectator
Chai Lam as spectator
Mama Hung as Yen Yen's mother
Kwan Yan
Leung Seung-wan
Wu Chi-chin
To Wing-leung
Gam Tin-chue
Lam Yuen

External links

The Eunuch on Hong Kong Cinemagic

1970s action films
1971 films
Hong Kong martial arts films
Shaw Brothers Studio films
Wuxia films
1970s Hong Kong films